Grant McNeill (born June 8, 1983) is a Canadian former professional ice hockey defenceman. He was drafted 68th overall in the 2001 NHL Entry Draft by the Florida Panthers and played three games with the Panthers in the National Hockey League in the 2003–04 season. 

He last played with the South Carolina Stingrays of the ECHL on contract from the Hershey Bears of the American Hockey League.

Career statistics

References

External links
 

1983 births
Living people
Canadian ice hockey defencemen
Florida Everblades players
Florida Panthers draft picks
Florida Panthers players
Hershey Bears players
Ice hockey people from Alberta
People from the County of Vermilion River
Prince Albert Raiders players
Rochester Americans players
San Antonio Rampage players
South Carolina Stingrays players
Texas Wildcatters players
Wheeling Nailers players
Wilkes-Barre/Scranton Penguins players